The Little Abitibi River is a river in northern Ontario.  It runs about  up into the Abitibi Canyon, where Ontario Power Generation's Abitibi Canyon Generating Station dams the river at Fraserdale, an abandoned railway town.

It was made famous in "The Black Fly Song" which concerned the construction of a dam on the Little Abitibi River, which was also referred to as "Little Ab."

See also 
 Little Abitibi Provincial Park
 List of rivers of Ontario

References 
  Ontario Ministry of Natural Resources. Cochrane District Land Use Guidelines – General Resource Areas. The Little Abitibi River - New Post Creek Waterway, page 33
    Atlas of Canada - Little Abitibi River

Rivers of Cochrane District